Revolution Studios Distribution Company, LLC, operating as Revolution Studios, is an American motion picture and television studio headed by Chief Executive Officer Scott Hemming.

The company focuses primarily on the distribution, remake and sequel rights to titles in its library, which it continues to add to through acquisitions and new productions.

Company history 
On January 12, 2000, after a successful run at Walt Disney Studios, and their time at 20th Century Fox and Caravan Pictures, Joe Roth left Disney, to create a yet-unnamed venture. On February 17, 2000, Roth signed an agreement with actress Julia Roberts to star in their films as well as producing through their Shoelace Productions banner.

On June 7, 2000, Roth officially decided to name their new venture Revolution Studios and announced that Tomcats is the first film to be produced by the studio. On the same day, the studio entered into an agreement with Sony Pictures Entertainment—which also owned a stake in the company—to distribute and market Revolution's films. Roth owned the controlling interest in Revolution. Other equity owners included Hollywood executives Todd Garner, Rob Moore, Tom Sherak and Elaine Goldsmith-Thomas, as well as Starz Entertainment and 20th Century Fox.

On January 5, 2005, it signed a television syndication distribution deal with Debmar-Mercury to market their library to syndication.

Coinciding with the end of its six-year distribution deal with Sony in 2007, Revolution turned its attention to exploiting the remake, sequel and television rights to films in its library. Joe Roth suddenly decided to move into a producing deal with Sony Pictures to start their own production company.

In August 2006, Revolution announced that it had licensed to Universal Pictures the sequel rights to its comic-book-inspired hit Hellboy (2004). Universal released Hellboy II: The Golden Army in the United States in 2008.

Revolution produced a sitcom based on its comedy feature Are We There Yet?, which ran from 2010 to 2012 on TBS, as well as a sitcom adaptation of Anger Management, which ran from 2012 to 2014 on FX.

In June 2014, Roth announced that he had sold Revolution Studios to funds managed by Fortress Investment Group, for roughly $250 million. Roth continues to serve as a strategic adviser and develops television projects for the studio through a first-look deal. Concurrent with the sale, former Chief Operating Officer Vince Totino was promoted to CEO and former finance executive Scott Hemming was named COO.

After the sale, the newly recapitalized Revolution Studios began adding to its library through a series of acquisitions. In October 2014, it acquired the foreign rights and copyrights of Morgan Creek Productions.

In October 2015, Revolution acquired Cross Creek Pictures' 50% interests in feature films Black Swan and The Ides of March. Later that month, Revolution purchased the eight-film Cold Spring Pictures film library, including the 2009 Academy Award nominee and Golden Globe Award winner Up in the Air.

Also in 2015, Revolution announced a partnership with Universal Pictures Home Entertainment to produce non-theatrical sequels, prequels or other spinoffs based on the titles in Revolution's library. 

In June 2016, Revolution expanded its library to 126 films when it acquired worldwide rights to five films produced by Graham King's GK Films: Hugo, The Tourist, Edge of Darkness, The Rum Diary and The Young Victoria. The rights were previously held by Dallas-based Tango Films. In January 2017, the studio returned to film production with their release XXX: Return of Xander Cage, the company's first film since 2007's The Water Horse: Legend of the Deep.

In January 2017, Content Partners LLC and its affiliate CP Enterprises acquired Revolution Studios from investment funds managed by affiliates of Fortress Investment Group for an undisclosed price.

Corporate partnerships 
In October 2014, Revolution Studios forged a global licensing pact with Miramax, wherein the latter company would sell the worldwide television and digital distribution rights to Revolution's library. Miramax has been handling U.S. sales of the Revolution library since June 2012.

In May 2016, Revolution announced that it had made a seven-figure investment for a stake in Spanish-language digital services company Latin Everywhere, agreeing to license Spanish-dubbed versions of its library titles to Latin Everywhere's video streaming platform Pongalo (Spanish for “play it”).

In October 2019, Revolution signed a worldwide television and digital distribution deal with Sony Pictures Television, covering the Revolution and Morgan Creek libraries.

Films 
Here is a list of films independently produced by Revolution:

Theatrical films

Direct-to-video films

Television

Television movies/specials

See also 
 Caravan Pictures/Spyglass Media Group
 Morgan Creek Entertainment
 Roth/Kirschenbaum Films

References

External links 
 Revolution Studios

Film production companies of the United States
 
Television production companies of the United States
Mass media companies established in 2000
2000 establishments in California
Companies based in Los Angeles